"When Did You Stop Loving Me" is a song written by Donny Kees and Monty Holmes and recorded by American country music artist George Strait. It was released in April 1993 as the third and final single from his album Pure Country. The song reached both No. 6 on the Billboard Hot Country Singles & Tracks chart and on the Canadian RPM Country Tracks chart.

Chart performance
"When Did You Stop Loving Me" debuted at number 62 on the U.S. Billboard Hot Country Singles & Tracks for the week of May 1, 1993.

Year-end charts

Other versions

George Jones covered the song on his 1998 album It Don't Get Any Better Than This and on the same record label (MCA Records).

References

1993 singles
1992 songs
George Strait songs
George Jones songs
Song recordings produced by Tony Brown (record producer)
Songs written by Monty Holmes
MCA Records singles
Songs written by Donny Kees